"Rock the Party (Off the Hook)" is a song by American Christian metal band P.O.D. It was released in August 2000 as the second single from their third studio album The Fundamental Elements of Southtown. The music video for "Rock the Party (Off the Hook)" was No. 18 on TVU's 50 Best Videos of All Time list.

Track listing
 "Rock the Party (Off the Hook)"
 "Freestyle (Rock Mix)"
 "Sabbath"

Chart and sales

Awards 
Dove Awards
2001 - Short Form Music Video of the Year

In other media 

It was heard once on "Dance", an episode of PEN15.

References

2000 singles
P.O.D. songs
Music videos directed by Marcos Siega
1999 songs
Songs written by Noah Bernardo
Songs written by Marcos Curiel
Songs written by Traa Daniels
Songs written by Sonny Sandoval
Songs about parties